The 2015 Rossendale Borough Council election took place on 7 May 2015 to elect members of the Rossendale Borough Council in England. It was held on the same day as other local elections.

Councillors elected in 2011 were defending their seats this year, and they were contested again in 2019.

Election result

Ward results

Cribden

Facit and Shawforth

Greenfield

Greensclough

Hareholme

Healey and Whitworth

Helmshore

Irwell

Longholme

Stacksteads

Whitewell

Worsley

References

2015 English local elections
May 2015 events in the United Kingdom
2015
2010s in Lancashire